Love and Radiation is the fourth studio album from Christian rock band All Star United. It was released in 2006 after a four-year hiatus from the studio. During this break, band leader Ian Eskelin released his second solo album titled Save the Humans in 2004. (Eskelin had previously released a solo album, Supersonic Dream Day mononymously as Ian in 1995 before the founding of All Star United.)

The album was released by Furious in the UK and by 7 Spin Music in the US on May 26, 2007.

Track listing
 "Love And Radiation" (3:40)
 "You You You (Yeah Yeah Yeah)" (3:20)
 "Before You Break My Heart" (3:27)
 "We Could Be Brilliant" (3:23)
 "Let's Rock Tonight" (3:13)
 "Jesus On The Radio" (3:35)
 "There's Gotta Be Something" (2:39)
 "The Song Of The Year" (3:12)
 "In A World Where Nothing's Wrong (You're Alright)" (3:16)
 "Like Hallelujah" (3:02)
 "Take Me A Way" (4:31)

Personnel
 Christian Crowe - Drums
 Ian Eskelin - Vocals, Keyboards
 Mike Payne - Guitar
 Adrian Walther - Bass Guitar
 Brian Whitman - Guitar, Backing Vocals
 Costa Balamatsias - Additional Bass Guitar
 Steve Hindalong - Additional Vocals
 Aaron Mortenson - Additional Drums

References

2006 albums
All Star United albums